This is a partial list of molecules that contain 5 carbon atoms.

See also
 Carbon number
 List of compounds with carbon number 4
 List of compounds with carbon number 6

C05